The State Register of Heritage Places is maintained by the Heritage Council of Western Australia. , 259 places are heritage-listed in the City of Kalamunda, of which 17 are on the State Register of Heritage Places.

List
The Western Australian State Register of Heritage Places, lists the following 17 state registered places within the City of Kalamunda:

References

Kalamunda